There are 100 members of the Senate of Poland that will sit until 2023. They were all elected in 100 single-member constituencies at the 2019 Polish parliamentary election.

Leadership 
Tomasz Grodzki was elected the Marshal of the Senate at its first sitting.

List of political officers

Makeup

List

References

See also 

 9th term Sejm and 10th term Senate of Poland

2019
Lists of current national legislators
 2019